Lucas v. South Carolina Coastal Council, 505 U.S. 1003 (1992), was a case in which the Supreme Court of the United States established the "total takings" test for evaluating whether a particular regulatory action constitutes a regulatory taking that requires compensation.

Background

Plaintiff/Petitioner  David H. Lucas, owner of two beachfront properties in Isle of Palms, South Carolina. 
Defendant/Respondent  South Carolina Coastal Council, a body that grants permits for the use of beachfront land.

State of law
South Carolina's Coastal Zone Management Act (1977) required owners of coast land in "critical areas" near beaches to obtain permits from Respondent South Carolina Coastal Council before committing the land to new uses.  The state's Beachfront Management Act (1988), S.C. Code Ann. § 48-39-10 et seq. (1989 Cum. Supp.), increased the regulations on the use of coastal land.

Facts of case
Petitioner David H. Lucas owned two vacant oceanfront lots in the Beachwood East Subdivision of the Wild Dunes development on the Isle of Palms in Charleston County, South Carolina.  The Beachfront Management Act effectively prevented Petitioner Lucas from erecting homes on properties due to the effects it would have on the public beach.

Prior history
Lucas filed suit asserting that the restrictions on the use of his lots was a taking of his property without just compensation. The lower court agreed and awarded Lucas $1,232,387.50 as just compensation for the regulatory taking. The government of South Carolina appealed, and the Supreme Court of South Carolina reversed.

Procedural posture
Petitioner Lucas seeks reversal of the South Carolina Supreme Court judgment, reinstatement of the trial court judgment, and declaration that the Beachfront Management Act constituted a taking.

Supreme Court Review

Issue
Whether the South Carolina Supreme Court erred in holding that the Beachfront Management Act was a valid exercise of the police power and did not constitute a taking.

Arguments/theories
Petitioner  Not stated, presumed reflected in holding and reasoning.
Respondent  (1) The Beachfront Management Act is a valid exercise of the police power, as the beach/dune area of the shores is a valuable public resource, and the erection of structures on that land contributes to erosion and destruction of that resource.  (2) All property is held subject to the limitation that the state may regulate the property in such a way as to remove all value.

Rule of law
A regulation that deprives an owner of all economically beneficial uses of land constitutes a taking unless the proscribed use interests were not part of the title to begin with.  In other words, a law or decree with the effect of depriving all economically beneficial use must do no more than duplicate the result that could have been achieved in the courts under the law of nuisance. As a result, "total takings" analysis requires a consideration of (1) the degree of harm to public lands or adjacent property posed by the regulated activities, (2) the social value of such activities, and (3) the relative ease with which the alleged harms can be avoided through measures taken by either the claimant or the government.

Opinion of the Court
In a majority opinion by Justice Antonin Scalia, the Court found that the South Carolina Supreme Court erred in holding that the Beachfront Management Act was a valid exercise of the police power and did not constitute a taking.

Reasoning
The majority argued as follows: (1) Deprivation of all economically beneficial use is, from the perspective of a property owner, deprivation of the property itself.  (2) When all economically beneficial use is restricted, it is difficult to assume that the legislature is simply "adjusting" economical benefits and burdens. (3) Regulations that restrict all economically beneficial use may often be a guise of pressing that land into public service.  (4) Lucas's lands have been deprived of all economically beneficial use.  (5) There is no way to distinguish regulation that "prevents a harmful use" and confers benefits on nearby property.  (6) Contrary to Respondent South Carolina's assertion, title is not held subject to the limitation that the state may regulate away all the property's economically beneficial use.

Kennedy's Concurrence
Kennedy, J., concurring.  The determination of no value must be considered with reference to the owner's reasonable, investment-backed expectations.  Justice Kennedy also expressed concern with the idea that state regulation could go no further than duplicating the common law of nuisance without exposing itself to the challenge of categorical taking, as some fragile lands might prevent such public concern that the state can go further in regulating development than the common law of nuisance might otherwise permit.

Dissents
Blackmun, J., dissenting. The court should not have granted certiorari to hear this case and it ignores its jurisdictional limits, remakes its traditional rules of review and created simultaneously a new categorical rule and an exception. There could never be a total loss because the owner can still enjoy other attributes of ownership such as right to exclude others, picnic, swim, camp in a tent or live on the property in a movable trailer.

Additionally, state courts historically have been less likely to find that government action constituted a taking when the affected land is undeveloped. Neither is there a Common Law limit on the state's power to regulate harmful uses even to the point of destroying all economic value.

Stevens, J., dissenting. The categorical rule created by the court is unsound and an unwise addition to the law of takings. In the past the court had worked at rejecting an absolute formula for determining a taking and have frequently in the past held a law that renders property valueless may not constitute a taking. The new rule created by the court is arbitrary because a landowner whose property is diminished in value 95% recovers nothing while an owner whose property is diminished 100% recovers the land's full value.

Souter's statement
In an unusual filing, Justice Souter, a former state supreme court justice (in New Hampshire), wrote a statement in which he neither joined the majority or dissented and said the case should be dismissed on procedural grounds.  He wrote, "The case should have been dismissed as improperly granted, as the decision of the trial court that a total taking had occurred is highly questionable on the basis of the facts presented" because "The petition for review was granted on the assumption that the state [of South Carolina], by regulation, had deprived the owner of his entire economic interest in the subject property. Such was the state trial court's conclusion, which the state supreme court did not review."

Result

Judgment/disposition
Judgment reversed and cause remanded for determination of whether regulation could be enacted under state nuisance law.

Subsequent history
On remand at the South Carolina Supreme Court, the court granted the parties leave to amend their pleadings to determine what the actual damages were.

Legacy and other notes
Established the modern "total takings" test.

After paying Lucas $850,000 in compensation for the two lots, South Carolina proceeded to sell the lots to private parties for development.  A 5,000-square-foot private home now sits on one lot, while the other remains undeveloped.

See also
 List of United States Supreme Court cases, volume 505
 List of United States Supreme Court cases
 Lists of United States Supreme Court cases by volume
 List of United States Supreme Court cases by the Rehnquist Court
Grape Bay Ltd v Attorney-General of Bermuda [1999] UKPC 43
English land law
South African land law

References

External links
 

United States Supreme Court cases
United States land use case law
Takings Clause case law
1992 in the environment
1992 in United States case law
Charleston County, South Carolina
1992 in South Carolina
United States Supreme Court cases of the Rehnquist Court
Zoning in the United States